Ai Ouchi (born 17 September 1974) is a Japanese archer. She competed in the women's individual and team events at the 1996 Summer Olympics.

References

1974 births
Living people
Japanese female archers
Olympic archers of Japan
Archers at the 1996 Summer Olympics
Place of birth missing (living people)
Archers at the 1994 Asian Games
Archers at the 1998 Asian Games
Asian Games competitors for Japan
20th-century Japanese women